The swimming competition at the 2014 Central American and Caribbean Games was held in Veracruz, Mexico.

The tournament was scheduled to be held from 15–20 November at the Leyes de Reforma Aquatic Center. Open water swimming was scheduled to be held from 21–22 November at Regatas Beach.

Medal summary

Men's events

Women's events

Medal table

References

External links
Official Website
Results

2014 Central American and Caribbean Games events
2014 in swimming
2014
International aquatics competitions hosted by Mexico